Zinc ammonium chloride is the inorganic compound with the formula (NH4)2ZnCl4.  It is the ammonium salt of tetrachlorozincate.  It used as a flux in the process of hot-dip galvanizing.

Uses 
Steel to be galvanized passes through an acidic cleaning process to remove iron oxide "mill scale". After this process, the surface of the steel is very active and oxide layers begin forming immediately upon exposure to the atmosphere. Zinc ammonium chloride flux in aqueous solution is applied to the steel to reduce any oxides that are formed and/or inhibit them from forming altogether. This allows the molten zinc in the proceeding galvanizing step to maximally adhere to and alloy with the surface of the steel.

Precautions 
Zinc ammonium chloride is a Class 9 hazardous material (Miscellaneous) according to the U.S. DOT.

References

ammonium chloride
Tetrachlorozincates
zinc